Lomaptera are beetles from the subfamily Cetoniinae, tribe Schizorhinini. The genus was created by Gory & Percheron, in 1833. The type species of the genus is Cetonia papua Guérin-Méneville, 1830. These cetoniids have the tip of the scutellum invisible, which makes the difference with the genus Ischiopsopha.

The genus is spread throughout the whole Australian region.

Species 

 Lomaptera abdominalis Moser, 1906
 Lomaptera aciculata Heller, 1899
 Lomaptera adelpha J. Thomson, 1857
 Lomaptera albertisi Gestro, 1874
 Lomaptera allardi Rigout, 1997
 Lomaptera annae Heller, 1899
 Lomaptera antoinei Rigout, 1997
 Lomaptera arrowi Valck Lucassen, 1961
 Lomaptera aurata Gestro, 1879
 Lomaptera australis Wallace, 1867
 Lomaptera batchiana J. Thomson, 1860
 Lomaptera bretoni Rigout, 1997
 Lomaptera bugeiae Antoine, 2004
 Lomaptera burgeoni Valck Lucassen, 1961
 Lomaptera carinipyga Moser, 1917
 Lomaptera cinnamomea J. Thomson, 1878
 Lomaptera concolor Schürhoff, 1935
 Lomaptera helleriana Valck Lucassen, 1961
 Lomaptera corpulenta Janson, 1905
 Lomaptera cyclopensis Valck Lucassen, 1961
 Lomaptera darcisi Heller, 1899
 Lomaptera diaphonia Kraatz, 1880
 Lomaptera doriae Gestro, 1878
 Lomaptera doreica Mohnike, 1871
 Lomaptera exquisita Schürhoff, 1935
 Lomaptera fasciata Moser, 1923
 Lomaptera fluminensis Schürhoff, 1935
 Lomaptera foersteri Moser, 1913
 Lomaptera frederici Legrand, 2006
 Lomaptera fulgida Moser, 1910
 Lomaptera funebris Heller, 1899
 Lomaptera gagnyi Rigout, 1997
 Lomaptera geelvinkiana Gestro, 1876
 Lomaptera gestroi Valck Lucassen, 1961
 Lomaptera giesbersi Kraatz, 1894
 Lomaptera gilnicki Kraatz, 1885
 Lomaptera girouxi Le Thuaut, 2005
 Lomaptera gloriosa Raffray, 1878
 Lomaptera gracilis Valck Lucassen, 1961
 Lomaptera gressitti Rigout, 1997
 Lomaptera hackeri Lea, 1906
 Lomaptera helleri Moser, 1913
 Lomaptera helleriana Valck Lucassen, 1961
 Lomaptera horni Valck Lucassen, 1961
 Lomaptera hoyoisi Rigout, 1997
 Lomaptera humeralis Lansberge, 1880
 Lomaptera hyalina Moser, 1908
 Lomaptera insularis Valck Lucassen, 1961
 Lomaptera iridescens Heller, 1903
 Lomaptera joallandi Le Thuaut, 2005
 Lomaptera kaestneri Schürhoff, 1935
 Lomaptera limbata Heller, 1894
 Lomaptera linae Gestro, 1893
 Lomaptera loriae Gestro, 1893
 Lomaptera lousi Audureau, 2000
 Lomaptera lutea Janson, 1915
 Lomaptera macrophylla Gestro, 1874
 Lomaptera mayri Valck Lucassen, 1961
 Lomaptera meeki Valck Lucassen, 1961
 Lomaptera miaae Rigout, 1997
 Lomaptera mixta Rigout, 1997
 Lomaptera mortiana Valck Lucassen, 1961
 Lomaptera moseri Heller, 1915
 Lomaptera mucterophalloides Van de Poll, 1886
 Lomaptera mutabilis Moser, 1908
 Lomaptera mycterophallus Heller, 1915
 Lomaptera negata Heller, 1899
 Lomaptera nickerli Schoch, 1898
 Lomaptera orientalis Valck Lucassen, 1961
 Lomaptera otakwana Valck Lucassen, 1961
 Lomaptera pallidipes Kraatz, 1895
 Lomaptera papua (Guérin-Méneville, 1830)
 Lomaptera pepini Rigout, 1997
 Lomaptera prasina Kraatz, 1887
 Lomaptera pseudannae Schürhoff, 1935
 Lomaptera pseudopulchella Valck Lucassen, 1961
 Lomaptera pseudorufa Heller, 1899
 Lomaptera pulchella Janson, 1905
 Lomaptera punctata Montrouzier, 1857
 Lomaptera pusilla Kraatz, 1887
 Lomaptera pygidialis J. Thomson, 1860
 Lomaptera pygmaea Kraatz, 1880
 Lomaptera ribbei Kraatz, 1885
 Lomaptera rosselensis Valck Lucassen, 1961
 Lomaptera rotundata Valck Lucassen, 1961
 Lomaptera rubens Janson, 1915
 Lomaptera rufa Kraatz, 1880
 Lomaptera salvadori Gestro, 1876
 Lomaptera samuelsoni Rigout, 1997
 Lomaptera saruwagedana Schürhoff, 1935
 Lomaptera satanas Heller, 1902
 Lomaptera semicastanea Kraatz, 1887
 Lomaptera simbangensis Schürhoff, 1935
 Lomaptera sordida Schoch, 1898
 Lomaptera splendida Moser, 1913
 Lomaptera sticheri Alexis & Delpont, 2000
 Lomaptera subarouensis J. Thomson, 1860
 Lomaptera thoracica Valck Lucassen, 1961
 Lomaptera tuberculata Valck Lucassen, 1961
 Lomaptera pseudannae Schürhoff, 1935
 Lomaptera uyttenboogaarti De Jong, 1970
 Lomaptera varians Schürhoff, 1935
 Lomaptera versteegi Moser, 1926
 Lomaptera vrazi Schoch, 1898
 Lomaptera wahnesi  Moser, 1906
 Lomaptera wollastoni Valck Lucassen, 1961
 Lomaptera xanthopyga Gestro, 1874

The details of the paramers have been published in the volume 25 of The Beetles of the World, together with many distribution maps.

References 
  1. Alexis & Delpont, 2000. Description de sept nouvelles espèces et de deux sous espèces..., Lambillionea, C, pp. 53–68
  2. Antoine (Ph.), 2004. Contribution à l'étude des Schizorhinini..., Coléoptères, 10(7), pp. 75–89
  3. Audureau (A.), 2000. Description de deux nouvelles espèces de Cetoniidae d'Irian Jaya, Lambillionea, C, pp. 388–390
  4. Legrand (J.-Ph.), 2006. Trois nouvelles espèces de Schizorhinini de Nouvelle-Guinée, Les Cahiers Magellanes, (H.S.), 17, p. 6
  5. Le Thault (P.), 2005. Contribution à l'étude du genre Lomaptera et description de Lomaptera girouxi n. sp., Cetoniimania, 2(1), pp. 40–45
  6. Le Thault (P.), 2005. Contribution à l'étude du genre Lomaptera et description de Lomaptera nova sp. joallandi, Cetoniimania, 2(2), pp. 60–65
  7. Rigout (J.) et Allard (V.), 1997. The Beetles of the World, volume 25, Hillside Books, Canterbury, pp. 40–128 
  8. Valck Lucassen (F.), 1961. Monographie du genre Lomaptera Gory & Percheron, Nederlandsche Entomologische Vereeniging, pp. 1–299

Cetoniinae